Kuld [Gold], subtitled Ballaadid aastatest 1987-1997 [Ballads from the years 1987-1997] is a ballad compilation by Estonian rock band Terminaator, released on their 10th anniversary. It's their fourth album. It includes ballads from 1987-1997 (from albums "Lõputu päev", "Minu väike paradiis", "Pühertoonia" and three new ones). It was released in 1997 and re-released in 2003. Most of the songs are renewed. Since the release of the album, in the radio, "Kuld" versions are played and these versions are more well known.

Track listing 

 "Hoia mind" [Hold me] (E.Liitmaa/J.Kreem) - 5:38
 "Torm" [Storm] (J.Kreem) - 5:02
 "Ainult sina võid mu maailma muuta" [Only you can change my world] (J.Kreem) - 4:39
 "Kes uskus" [Who believed] (J.Kreem) - 4:44
 "4B" (E.Liitmaa/J.Kreem) - 5:48
 "Ütle miks?" [Tell me why?] (J.Kreem) - 3:05
 "Kristallkülmas öös" [In a crystal cold night] (E.Kaljulaid/J.Kreem) - 5:22
 "Kaitseta" [Defenseless] (J.Kreem, Sulliwan/J.Kreem) - 4:53
 "Sina oled kõik..." [You're everything...] (J.Kreem) - 4:05
 "Ingli puudutus" [Touch of an angel] (J.Kreem, Sulliwan/J.Kreem) - 8:27
 "Juulikuu lumi" [Snow of July] (J.Kreem) - 6:01

Song information 

 "Hoia mind" is a new song. It's a typical love song about not letting go.
 "Torm" is from "Lõputu päev".
 "Ainult sina võid mu maailma muuta" is also from "Lõputu päev" and unchanged.
 "Kes uskus" is from "Pühertoonia" and is only slightly changed. The question mark in the title is gone.
 "4B" is from "Minu väike paradiis". The intro of the song is longer and the song is slightly slower.
 "Ütle miks?" is from "Minu väike paradiis". It sounds more like rock, more instruments are added; a question mark is added to the title.
 "Kristallkülmas öös" is from "Pühertoonia". The sound is a lot heavier.
 "Kaitseta" is a new song. It features Evelin Samuel. It's about hiding from life and ending up defenseless.
 "Sina oled kõik..." is a new song. The narrator is wondering, why his beloved doesn't see his love for her.
 "Ingli puudutus" is from "Pühertoonia" and it's 2 seconds longer.
 "Juulikuu lumi" is from "Minu väike paradiis". The "Kuld" version is 3 seconds longer.

A song from "Pühertoonia", "Valge liblika..." (White butterfly's...), is included as the twelveteenth song in the booklet of some editions, although this song doesn't appear on the album. In the booklet it's titled "Valge liblika lugu" (The story of the white butterfly).

Personnel
Elmar Liitmaa - guitars on 1, 5, 6, 9, 11; drum on 6
Sven Valdmann - bass on 1, 2, 4, 5, 7-11
Eimel Kaljulaid - drums on 1, 2, 4, 5, 7-11; piano on 3; back on 1, 9
Harmo Kallaste - keyboards on 1, 5, 7, 11; back on 1
Sulev "Sulliwan" Müürsepp - guitars and keyboards on 4, 7, 8, 10; shakers and harmonica on 8; back on 1, 9, 10
Jaagup Kreem - vocals; back on 1, 6, 8, 10, 11
Margus Valk - guitars on 2, 4, 8
Evelin Samuel - vocals and back on 8

Producers
Tracks 1, 5, 9, 11: E. Liitmaa & Terminaator
Tracks 2, 4, 8: Sulliwan & Terminaator
Tracks 3, 10: Terminaator
Track 6: E. Liitmaa & J. Kreem

External links 
 Estmusic.com Listen to the songs.

Terminaator albums
1997 compilation albums
Estonian-language albums